The 1994 Nabisco Dinah Shore was a women's professional golf tournament, held March 24–27 at Mission Hills Country Club in Rancho Mirage, California. This was the 23rd edition of the Nabisco Dinah Shore, and the twelfth as a major championship.

Tournament host Dinah Shore died of cancer a month earlier on February 24. On the Tuesday of tournament week, it was announced that the LPGA had elected her an honorary member of its Hall of Fame.

Donna Andrews won her only major title by a stroke over runner-up Laura Davies; a two-shot swing took place on the 72nd hole, as Andrews scored a birdie while Davies made bogey. She started the annual tradition by jumping into Poppie's Pond, which continues to now. Andrews began the round with a one-stroke lead over Davies, and both shot 70.

Past champions in the field

 Juli Inkster (1984, 1989) did not play

Final leaderboard
Sunday, March 27, 1994

Scorecard
Final round

Cumulative tournament scores, relative to par
{|class="wikitable" span = 50 style="font-size:85%;
|-
|style="background: Pink;" width=10|
|Birdie
|style="background: PaleGreen;" width=10|
|Bogey
|}
Source:

References

External links
Golf Observer leaderboard

Chevron Championship
Golf in California
Nabisco Dinah Shore
Nabisco Dinah Shore
Nabisco Dinah Shore
Nabisco Dinah Shore
Women's sports in California